The Supreme Court of the United States handed down twelve per curiam opinions during its 2002 term, which began October 7, 2002 and concluded October 5, 2003.

Because per curiam decisions are issued from the Court as an institution, these opinions all lack the attribution of authorship or joining votes to specific justices. All justices on the Court at the time the decision was handed down are assumed to have participated and concurred unless otherwise noted.

Court membership

Chief Justice: William Rehnquist

Associate Justices: John Paul Stevens, Sandra Day O'Connor, Antonin Scalia, Anthony Kennedy, David Souter, Clarence Thomas, Ruth Bader Ginsburg, Stephen Breyer

Early v. Packer

INS v. Ventura

Woodford v. Visciotti

Abdur'Rahman v. Bell

Kaupp v. Texas

Los Angeles v. David

Bunkley v. Florida

Citizens Bank v. Alafabco, Inc.

Nike, Inc. v. Kasky

See also 
 List of United States Supreme Court cases, volume 537
 List of United States Supreme Court cases, volume 538
 List of United States Supreme Court cases, volume 539

Notes

References

 

United States Supreme Court per curiam opinions
Lists of 2002 term United States Supreme Court opinions
2002 per curiam